Tigerstedt is a Swedish surname. Notable persons with that name include:

 Eric Tigerstedt (1887–1925), Finnish inventor
 Robert Tigerstedt (1853–1923), Finnish medical scientist
 E. N. Tigerstedt (1907-1979) Finnish-Swedish literary historian and Plato scholar